Harold Douglas Hopkins (6 March 194411 December 2011) was an Australian film and television actor.

Early life
Hopkins was born in 1944 in Toowoomba, Queensland. He attended Toowoomba Grammar School as a day boy in 1958 and 1959. During the 1960s, he worked as an apprentice carpenter, and was exposed to asbestos fibres without protective masks or clothing. He and his twin brother John enrolled at the National Institute of Dramatic Art (NIDA) in Sydney, with Harold graduating in 1967.

Harold Hopkins married twice. His second marriage was to Sue Collie, an actress he met in Melbourne in 1977, while starring in the original stage production of David Williamson's The Club at the MTC.

Career
Hopkins appeared in 16 films over the course of his career, including classic Australian films Don's Party, The Picture Show Man and Gallipoli. He was nominated for an Australian Film Institute Award in 1981 for his supporting role in The Club. Hopkins also appeared in more than 160 episodes of Australian television series such as Barrier Reef, Homicide, The Godfathers, Twenty Good Years, Sara Dane, A Nice Little Earner and Underbelly: A Tale of Two Cities. He also had a major co-starring role opposite Jeanie Drynan in the 1969 ABC drama "Pastures of the Blue Crane".

Hopkins' last audition was for a role in Baz Luhrmann's The Great Gatsby, although he knew he would not live to play the role.

He won a Penguin Award in 1974 for his portrayal of Percy Deane in John Power's docudrama Billy and Percy.

Death
In 2011, Hopkins was diagnosed with mesothelioma, believed to be due to his asbestos exposure in the 1960s. He died in a Sydney hospice in Wahroonga on 11 December 2011.

Filmography

Film

 You Can't See 'round Corners (1969) – Soldier at dance (uncredited)
 Age of Consent (1969) – Ted Farrell
 Adam's Woman (1970) – Cosh
 Demonstrator (1971) – Malcolm
 Don's Party (1976) – Cooley / Susan's boyfriend
 The Picture Show Man (1977) – Larry Pym
 The Club (1980) – Danny Rowe
 Gallipoli (1981) – Les McCann
 The Highest Honor (1982) – Cpl. C.M. Stewart
 Monkey Grip (1982) – Willie
 Ginger Meggs (1982) – Mr. Fox
 Buddies (1983) – Johnny
 The Winds of Jarrah (1983) – Jack Farrell
 Stanley: Every Home Should Have One (1984) – Harry
 Fantasy Man (1984) – Nick Bailey
 The Year My Voice Broke (1987) – Tom Alcock
 Resistance (1992)
 Kin chan no Cinema Jack (1993) – Peach
 No Worries (1993) – John Burke
 Children of the Revolution (1996) – Police Commissioner
 Blackrock (1997) – Principal
 Joey (1997) – Kanga Catcher
 Our Lips Are Sealed (2000) – Shelby Shaw
 Courts mais GAY: Tome 5 (2003) – Dan (segment "Saturn's Return")
 The Clinic (2010) – Grave Digger (final film role)

Television
 Motel (1968) – Bruce Jackson
 Pastures of the Blue Crane (1969) – Perry the taxi driver
 Barrier Reef (1971–1972) – Steve Gabo
 The Young Doctors (1978) - Orderly Terry Cooper
 Sara Dane (1982) – Andrew McLeay
The Dirtwater Dynasty (1983) Reverend Mc Bride
 Fields of Fire (1987) – Whacker
 The True Believers (1988) – Edgar Ross
 Big Ideas (1993, TV Movie) – Sam Stevens
 Heartland (1994, TV series) – Jim
 Blue Heelers (season 1) (1994) episode 36, Adverse Possession — Geoff Lovett
 Outriders (2001) – Hayden Simpson
 Underbelly: A Tale of Two Cities (2009) – George Joseph

References

External links

1944 births
2011 deaths
Australian male film actors
Australian male television actors
National Institute of Dramatic Art alumni
People from Toowoomba
Deaths from cancer in New South Wales
Deaths from mesothelioma